Tobias Hangaard Linge (born 28 July 1997) is a Norwegian politician for the Labour Party.

He served as a deputy representative to the Parliament of Norway from Akershus during the term 2021–2025.  Hailing from Grav in Bærum, he became leader of Akershus Workers' Youth League in 2018.

References

1997 births
Living people
Deputy members of the Storting
Labour Party (Norway) politicians
Bærum politicians